Low-rise pants, also known as "low-cut jeans", "lowriders" or "rap pants", are a type of pants that sit low on, or below, the hips, usually at least 8 centimetres (3 inches) lower than the navel. Low-rise pants have been available since the 1960’s
, in styles for both men and women, with popularity increasing in the West in the early 1970’s.

Terminology 
The latter can also be classified as "ultra low-rise jeans", and the small zipper no longer has its traditional function, but is rather a display of fashion.

History
Hip-huggers, the precursor to low-rise pants, were designed by Irene Kasmer, in 1957, in Los Angeles, and rose to popularity during the mid 1960s, with the mod fashion subculture, and with the hippies in the late 1960s. Often worn with light-cotton, paisley-printed tops or nehru-collared jackets, bell-bottomed hip-huggers were popularized by rock icons such as Jimi Hendrix, Janis Joplin, Jim Morrison, and Robert Plant. Later, hip-huggers became a staple of popular culture and were incorporated into the disco scene of the 1970s.

During the late 1970s and early 1980s, however, waistlines moved higher as wide, flared, bell-bottoms gradually gave way to designer straight-legged jeans. Throughout the 1980s and into the 1990s, as more women entered the corporate workforce, the high waist design remained predominant, with commercial designers such as Gloria Vanderbilt and Calvin Klein at the forefront.

The 1990s revival of low-rise jeans can be credited to British fashion designer Alexander McQueen, who first showed his famous low-rise "bumster" trousers in his 1996 "Dante" collection show. One commentator observed: "The bumster for me is what defined McQueen. For me it was the look that put him on the map because it was controversial. Those little bumsters were in his first shows. It was like 20 people in England were wearing them back then." Following McQueen's lead, the fashion of low-rise pants gradually spread. 
The iconic low-rise fashion emerged in 2000, particularly among youth; Britney Spears is most credited with popularizing the fashion in the US after she started wearing them that same year.  Although its popularity also increased among women and men of other ages, the major focus of advertising was still directed at teenage girls and boys, with typical teen stores selling low-rise jeans in different styles and colors. Most American teenage and twenty-something-oriented retail stores that carried jeans (e.g., Guess, American Eagle, Abercrombie & Fitch, Stitches) only or mostly carried low-rise jeans during this time.

Low-rise pants are experiencing a resurgence in popularity in the 2020s due to their association with early 2000s fashion, which in turn is being revitalized on social media platforms like TikTok for a new generation of teenagers. They've made a comeback in the last two years thanks to Kpop stars wearing them on regular occasions.

Styles

Low-rise jeans are manufactured in many styles, including boot-cut, flared, loose, straight, baggy, skinny, boyfriend, and slim. Due to the popularity of low-rise jeans, manufacturers have also begun making low-rise styles of other kinds of pants, such as cargo pants and dress pants.

Low-rise jeans may be worn to display more skin at the waist, torso, and hips. Accordingly, they are sometimes worn in combination with crop tops, giving a glimpse of skin between the jeans and the top, or (more commonly in the summer or in warmer countries) showing their entire midriff including the navel. From 2001 to 2007, the low rise style frequently revealed the thong or G-string underneath, but after 2007 this fell out of favor and thongs began their decline. When the wearer sits down or bends forward, sometimes cleavage is visible. When a thong is exposed above a pair of low-rise jeans on the back, it is commonly referred to as a whale tail, due to its somewhat similar shape. When boxer shorts become visible this is known as "sagging".  Because underwear was no longer always hidden, more men and women choose their underwear to function with their low-rise jeans.

See also
Buttock cleavage
Crop top
Halterneck
Hip-huggers
Jean skirt
Muffin top
Navel in popular culture
Sagging (fashion)

References

External links
telegraph.co.uk Ultra-low bikini jeans - only for the daring
Canadian Medical Association Journal
The woes of low-rise pants-Has America's low-rise obsession gone too far? - Amanda Fortini

Jeans by type
Trousers and shorts
20th-century fashion
21st-century fashion